Bala Naqib Kola (also Romanized as Bālā Naqīb Kolā) is a village in Pazevar Rural District, Rudbast District, Babolsar County, Mazandaran Province, Iran. At the 2006 census, its population was 470, in 124 families.

References 

Populated places in Babolsar County